Tagir Fasakhov (16 January 1964 – 29 March 1996) was a Kyrgyzstani footballer who was a striker for Alga Frunze, Alay Osh, Nyva Ternopil, Prykarpattya Ivano-Frankivsk and DAG-Liepaya. He was killed in road accident in Kazakhstan together with Kyrgyzstani players Ashilbek Momunov and Kanatbek Ishenbaev.

External links
Player profile – ffu.org.ua
Player profile – klisf.info
Career history in Alga Frunze

1964 births
1996 deaths
Kyrgyzstani footballers
Expatriate footballers in Ukraine
Kyrgyzstani expatriate footballers
Road incident deaths in Kazakhstan
FC Alay players
FC Alga Bishkek players
FC APK Morozovsk players
FC Nyva Ternopil players
FC Spartak Ivano-Frankivsk players
Ukrainian Premier League players
Association football forwards